Burmese (MLCTS: mranmabhasa,) is a Sino-Tibetan language spoken in Myanmar (also known as Burma), where it is an official language, lingua franca, and the native language of the Burmans, the country's principal ethnic group. Burmese is also spoken by the indigenous tribes in Chittagong Hill Tracts (Rangamati, Bandarban, Khagrachari, Cox's Bazar) in Bangladesh, and in Tripura state in Northeast India. Although the Constitution of Myanmar officially recognizes the English name of the language as the Myanmar language, most English speakers continue to refer to the language as Burmese, after Burma, the country's once previous and currently co-official name. Burmese is the common lingua franca in Myanmar, as the most widely-spoken language in the country. In 2007, it was spoken as a first language by 33 million, primarily the Burman people and related ethnic groups, and as a second language by 10 million, particularly ethnic minorities in Myanmar and neighboring countries. In 2022, the Burmese-speaking population was 38.8 million.

Burmese is a tonal, pitch-register (as well as social-register), and syllable-timed language, largely monosyllabic and agglutinative with a subject–object–verb word order. It is a member of the Lolo-Burmese grouping of the Sino-Tibetan language family. The Burmese alphabet is ultimately descended from a Brahmic script, either the Kadamba or Pallava alphabets.

Classification 
Burmese belongs to the Southern Burmish branch of the Sino-Tibetan languages, of which Burmese is the most widely spoken of the non-Sinitic languages. Burmese was the fifth of the Sino-Tibetan languages to develop a writing system, after Classical Chinese, Pyu, Old Tibetan and Tangut.

Dialects 
The majority of Burmese speakers, who live throughout the Irrawaddy River Valley, use a number of largely similar dialects, while a minority speak non-standard dialects found in the peripheral areas of the country. These dialects include:
 Tanintharyi Region: Merguese (Myeik, Beik), Tavoyan (Dawei), and Palaw
 Magway Region: Yaw
 Shan State: Intha, Taungyo, and Danu

Arakanese (Rakhine) in Rakhine State and Marma in Bangladesh are also sometimes considered dialects of Burmese and sometimes as separate languages.

Despite vocabulary and pronunciation differences, there is mutual intelligibility among Burmese dialects, as they share a common set of tones, consonant clusters, and written script. However, several Burmese dialects differ substantially from standard Burmese with respect to vocabulary, lexical particles, and rhymes.

Irrawaddy River valley 
Spoken Burmese is remarkably uniform among Burmese speakers, particularly those living in the Irrawaddy valley, all of whom use variants of Standard Burmese. The standard dialect of Burmese (the Mandalay-Yangon dialect continuum) comes from the Irrawaddy River valley. Regional differences between speakers from Upper Burma (e.g., Mandalay dialect), called anya tha and speakers from Lower Burma (e.g., Yangon dialect), called auk tha, largely occur in vocabulary choice, not in pronunciation. Minor lexical and pronunciation differences exist throughout the Irrawaddy River valley.

The standard dialect is represented by the Yangon dialect because of the modern city's media influence and economic clout. In the past, the Mandalay dialect represented standard Burmese. The most noticeable feature of the Mandalay dialect is its use of the first person pronoun , kya.nau  by both men and women, whereas in Yangon, the said pronoun is used only by male speakers while , kya.ma.  is used by female speakers. Moreover, with regard to kinship terminology, Upper Burmese speakers differentiate the maternal and paternal sides of a family, whereas Lower Burmese speakers do not.

The Mon language has also influenced subtle grammatical differences between the varieties of Burmese spoken in Lower and Upper Burma. In Lower Burmese varieties, the verb ပေး ('to give') is colloquially used as a permissive causative marker, like in other Southeast Asian languages, but unlike in other Tibeto-Burman languages. This usage is hardly used in Upper Burmese varieties, and is considered a sub-standard construct.

Outside the Irrawaddy basin 

More distinctive non-standard varieties emerge as one moves farther away from the Irrawaddy River valley toward peripheral areas of the country. These varieties include the Yaw, Palaw, Myeik (Merguese), Tavoyan and Intha dialects. Despite substantial vocabulary and pronunciation differences, there is mutual intelligibility among most Burmese dialects. Dialects in Tanintharyi Region, including Palaw, Merguese, and Tavoyan, are especially conservative in comparison to Standard Burmese. The Tavoyan and Intha dialects have preserved the  medial, which is otherwise only found in Old Burmese inscriptions. They also often reduce the intensity of the glottal stop. Beik has 250,000 speakers while Tavoyan has 400,000. The grammatical constructs of Burmese dialects in Southern Myanmar show greater Mon influence than Standard Burmese.

The most pronounced feature of the Arakanese language of Rakhine State is its retention of the  sound, which has become  in standard Burmese.

History 
The Burmese language's early forms include Old Burmese and Middle Burmese. Old Burmese dates from the 11th to the 16th century (Pagan to Ava dynasties); Middle Burmese from the 16th to the 18th century (Toungoo to early Konbaung dynasties); modern Burmese from the mid-18th century to the present. Word order, grammatical structure, and vocabulary have remained markedly stable well into Modern Burmese, with the exception of lexical content (e.g., function words).

Old Burmese 

The earliest attested form of the Burmese language is called Old Burmese, dating to the 11th and 12th century stone inscriptions of Pagan. The earliest evidence of the Burmese alphabet is dated to 1035, while a casting made in the 18th century of an old stone inscription points to 984.

Owing to the linguistic prestige of Old Pyu in the Pagan Kingdom era, Old Burmese borrowed a substantial corpus of vocabulary from Pali via the Pyu language. These indirect borrowings can be traced back to orthographic idiosyncrasies in these loanwords, such as the Burmese word "to worship," which is spelt ပူဇော် instead of ပူဇာ, as would be expected by the original Pali orthography.

Middle Burmese 

The transition to Middle Burmese occurred in the 16th century. The transition to Middle Burmese included phonological changes (e.g. mergers of sound pairs that were distinct in Old Burmese) as well as accompanying changes in the underlying orthography.

From the 1500s onward, Burmese kingdoms saw substantial gains in the populace's literacy rate, which manifested itself in greater participation of laymen in scribing and composing legal and historical documents, domains that were traditionally the domain of Buddhist monks, and drove the ensuing proliferation of Burmese literature, both in terms of genres and works. During this period, the Burmese alphabet began employing cursive-style circular letters typically used in palm-leaf manuscripts, as opposed to the traditional square block-form letters used in earlier periods. The orthographic conventions used in written Burmese today can largely be traced back to Middle Burmese.

Modern Burmese 
Modern Burmese emerged in the mid-18th century. By this time, male literacy in Burma stood at nearly 50%, which enabled the wide circulation of legal texts, royal chronicles, and religious texts. A major reason for the uniformity of the Burmese language was the near-universal presence of Buddhist monasteries (called kyaung) in Burmese villages. These kyaung served as the foundation of the pre-colonial monastic education system, which fostered uniformity of the language throughout the Upper Irrawaddy valley, the traditional homeland of Burmese speakers. The 1891 Census of India, conducted five years after the annexation of the entire Konbaung Kingdom, found that the former kingdom had an "unusually high male literacy" rate of 62.5% for Upper Burmans aged 25 and above. For all of British Burma, the literacy rate was 49% for men and 5.5% for women (by contrast, British India more broadly had a male literacy rate of 8.44%).

The expansion of the Burmese language into Lower Burma also coincided with the emergence of Modern Burmese. As late as the mid-1700s, Mon, an Austroasiatic language, was the principal language of Lower Burma, employed by the Mon people who inhabited the region. Lower Burma's shift from Mon to Burmese was accelerated by the Burmese-speaking Konbaung Dynasty's victory over the Mon-speaking Restored Hanthawaddy Kingdom in 1757. By 1830, an estimated 90% of the population in Lower Burma self-identified as Burmese-speaking Bamars; huge swaths of former Mon-speaking territory, from the Irrawaddy Delta to upriver in the north, spanning Bassein (now Pathein) and Rangoon (now Yangon) to Tharrawaddy, Toungoo, Prome (now Pyay), and Henzada (now Hinthada), were now Burmese-speaking. The language shift has been ascribed to a combination of population displacement, intermarriage, and voluntary changes in self-identification among increasingly Mon–Burmese bilingual populations in the region.

Standardized tone marking in written Burmese was not achieved until the 18th century. From the 19th century onward, orthographers created spellers to reform Burmese spelling, because of ambiguities that arose over transcribing sounds that had been merged. British rule saw continued efforts to standardize Burmese spelling through dictionaries and spellers.

Britain's gradual annexation of Burma throughout the 19th century, in addition to concomitant economic and political instability in Upper Burma (e.g., increased tax burdens from the Burmese crown, British rice production incentives, etc.) also accelerated the migration of Burmese speakers from Upper Burma into Lower Burma. British rule in Burma eroded the strategic and economic importance of the Burmese language; Burmese was effectively subordinated to the English language in the colonial educational system, especially in higher education.

In the 1930s, the Burmese language saw a linguistic revival, precipitated by the establishment of an independent University of Rangoon in 1920 and the inception of a Burmese language major at the university by Pe Maung Tin, modeled on Anglo Saxon language studies at the University of Oxford. Student protests in December of that year, triggered by the introduction of English into matriculation examinations, fueled growing demand for Burmese to become the medium of education in British Burma; a short-lived but symbolic parallel system of "national schools" that taught in Burmese, was subsequently launched. The role and prominence of the Burmese language in public life and institutions was championed by Burmese nationalists, intertwined with their demands for greater autonomy and independence from the British in the lead-up to the independence of Burma in 1948.

The 1948 Constitution of Burma prescribed Burmese as the official language of the newly independent nation. The Burma Translation Society and Rangoon University's Department of Translation and Publication were established in 1947 and 1948, respectively, with the joint goal of modernizing the Burmese language in order to replace English across all disciplines. Anti-colonial sentiment throughout the early post-independence era led to a reactionary switch from English to Burmese as the national medium of education, a process that was accelerated by the Burmese Way to Socialism. In August 1963, the socialist Union Revolutionary Government established the Literary and Translation Commission (the immediate precursor of the Myanmar Language Commission) to standardize Burmese spelling, diction, composition, and terminology. The latest spelling authority, named the Myanma Salonpaung Thatpon Kyan, was compiled in 1978 by the commission.

Registers 
Burmese is a diglossic language with two distinguishable registers (or diglossic varieties):
 Literary High (H) form ( mranma ca): the high variety (formal and written), used in literature (formal writing), newspapers, radio broadcasts, and formal speeches
 Spoken Low (L) form ( mranma ca.ka:): the low variety (informal and spoken), used in daily conversation, television, comics and literature (informal writing)

The literary form of Burmese retains archaic and conservative grammatical structures and modifiers (including affixes and pronouns) no longer used in the colloquial form. Literary Burmese, which has not changed significantly since the 13th century, is the register of Burmese taught in schools. In most cases, the corresponding affixes in the literary and spoken forms are totally unrelated to each other. Examples of this phenomenon include the following lexical terms:
 "this" (pronoun):   i →   di
 "that" (pronoun):   htui →   hui
 "at" (case):   hnai.  →   hma 
 plural (suffix):   mya: →   twe
 possessive (case):   i. →   re.
 "and" (conjunction):   hnang. →   ne.
 "if" (conjunction):   hlyang →   rang

Historically the literary register was preferred for written Burmese on the grounds that "the spoken style lacks gravity, authority, dignity". In the mid-1960s, some Burmese writers spearheaded efforts to abandon the literary form, asserting that the spoken vernacular form ought to be used. Some Burmese linguists such as Minn Latt, a Czech academic, proposed moving away from the high form of Burmese altogether. Although the literary form is heavily used in written and official contexts (literary and scholarly works, radio news broadcasts, and novels), the recent trend has been to accommodate the spoken form in informal written contexts. Nowadays, television news broadcasts, comics, and commercial publications use the spoken form or a combination of the spoken and simpler, less ornate formal forms.

The following sample sentence reveals that differences between literary and spoken Burmese mostly occur in affixes:

Burmese has politeness levels and honorifics that take the speaker's status and age in relation to the audience into account. The suffix  pa is frequently used after a verb to express politeness. Moreover, Burmese pronouns relay varying degrees of deference or respect. In many instances, polite speech (e.g., addressing teachers, officials, or elders) employs feudal-era third person pronouns or kinship terms in lieu of first- and second-person pronouns. Furthermore, with regard to vocabulary choice, spoken Burmese clearly distinguishes the Buddhist clergy (monks) from the laity (householders), especially when speaking to or about bhikkhus (monks). The following are examples of varying vocabulary used for Buddhist clergy and for laity:

 "sleep" (verb):  kyin:  for monks vs.  ip  for laity
 "die" (verb):  pyam tau mu  for monks vs.  se  for laity

Vocabulary 
Burmese primarily has a monosyllabic received Sino-Tibetan vocabulary. Nonetheless, many words, especially loanwords from Indo-European languages like English, are polysyllabic, and others, from Mon, an Austroasiatic language, are sesquisyllabic. Burmese loanwords are overwhelmingly in the form of nouns.

Historically, Pali, the liturgical language of Theravada Buddhism, had a profound influence on Burmese vocabulary. Burmese has readily adopted words of Pali origin; this may be due to phonotactic similarities between the two languages, alongside the fact that the script used for Burmese can be used to reproduce Pali spellings with complete accuracy. Pali loanwords are often related to religion, government, arts, and science.

Burmese loanwords from Pali primarily take four forms:
 Direct loan: direct import of Pali words with no alteration in orthography
 "life": Pali  jiva → Burmese  jiva
 Abbreviated loan: import of Pali words with accompanied syllable reduction and alteration in orthography (usually by means of a placing a diacritic, called athat  (lit. 'nonexistence') atop the last letter in the syllable to suppress the consonant's inherent vowel
 "karma": Pali  kamma → Burmese  kam
 "dawn": Pali  aruṇa → Burmese  aruṇ
 "merit": Pali  kusala → Burmese  kusuil
 Double loan: adoption of two different terms derived from the same Pali word
 Hybrid loan (e.g., neologisms or calques): construction of compounds combining native Burmese words with Pali or combine Pali words:
 "airplane":  , lit. 'air machine fly', ←  (native Burmese, 'air') +  (from Pali yana, 'vehicle') +  (native Burmese word, 'fly')

Burmese has also adapted numerous words from Mon, traditionally spoken by the Mon people, who until recently formed the majority in Lower Burma. Most Mon loanwords are so well assimilated that they are not distinguished as loanwords, as Burmese and Mon were used interchangeably for several centuries in pre-colonial Burma. Mon loans are often related to flora, fauna, administration, textiles, foods, boats, crafts, architecture, and music.

As a natural consequence of British rule in Burma, English has been another major source of vocabulary, especially with regard to technology, measurements, and modern institutions. English loanwords tend to take one of three forms:
 Direct loan: adoption of an English word, adapted to the Burmese phonology
 "democracy": English democracy → Burmese 
 Neologism or calque: translation of an English word using native Burmese constituent words
 "human rights": English 'human rights' → Burmese  ( 'human' +  'rights')
 Hybrid loan: construction of compound words by joining native Burmese words to English words
 'to sign':   ←  (English, sign) +  (native Burmese, 'inscribe').

To a lesser extent, Burmese has also imported words from Sanskrit (religion), Hindi (food, administration, and shipping), and Chinese (games and food). Burmese has also imported a handful of words from other European languages such as Portuguese.

Here is a sample of loan words found in Burmese:
 suffering:  , from Pali dukkha
 radio:  , from English radio
 method:  , from Mon
 springroll:  , from Hokkien 潤餅 (jūn-piáⁿ)
 wife:  , from Hindi jani
 noodle:  , from Shan  
 foot (unit of measurement):  , from Portuguese pé
 flag:  ,  ʿalam
 storeroom:  , from Malay gudang

Since the end of British rule, the Burmese government has attempted to limit usage of Western loans (especially from English) by coining new words (neologisms). For instance, for the word "television," Burmese publications are mandated to use the term  (lit. Another example is the word "vehicle", which is officially   (derived from Pali) but   (from English car) in spoken Burmese. Some previously common English loanwords have fallen out of use with the adoption of neologisms. An example is the word "university", formerly  , from English university, now  , a Pali-derived neologism recently created by the Burmese government and derived from the Pali spelling of Taxila ( Takkasīla), an ancient university town in modern-day Pakistan.

Some words in Burmese may have many synonyms, each having certain usages, such as formal, literary, colloquial, and poetic.

Phonology

Consonants 
The consonants of Burmese are as follows:

The final nasal is usually realised as nasalisation of the vowel. It may also allophonically appear as a homorganic nasal before stops.

Vowels 
The vowels of Burmese are:

Tones 
Burmese is a tonal language, which means phonemic contrasts can be made on the basis of the tone of a vowel. In Burmese, these contrasts involve not only pitch, but also phonation, intensity (loudness), duration, and vowel quality. However, some linguists consider Burmese a pitch-register language like Shanghainese.

There are four contrastive tones in Burmese. In the following table, the tones are shown marked on the vowel  as an example.

For example, the following words are distinguished from each other only on the basis of tone:
 Low   "shake"
 High   "be bitter"
 Creaky   "to wait upon; to attend on"
 Checked   "to beat; to strike"

 Low   "undergo"
 High   "dry up (usually a river)"
 Creaky   "appoint"

In spoken Burmese, some linguists classify two real tones (there are four nominal tones transcribed in written Burmese), "high" (applied to words that terminate with a stop or check, high-rising pitch) and "ordinary" (unchecked and non-glottal words, with falling or lower pitch), with those tones encompassing a variety of pitches. The "ordinary" tone consists of a range of pitches. Linguist L. F. Taylor concluded that "conversational rhythm and euphonic intonation possess importance" not found in related tonal languages and that "its tonal system is now in an advanced state of decay."

Syllable structure 
The syllable structure of Burmese is C(G)V((V)C), which is to say the onset consists of a consonant optionally followed by a glide, and the rime consists of a monophthong alone, a monophthong with a consonant, or a diphthong with a consonant. Some representative words are:
 CV   (title for young women)
 CVC   'to crave'
 CGV   'earth'
 CGVC   'eye'
 CVVC   (term of address for young men)
 CGVVC   'ditch'

A minor syllable has some restrictions:
 It contains  as its only vowel
 It must be an open syllable (no coda consonant)
 It cannot bear tone
 It has only a simple (C) onset (no glide after the consonant)
 It must not be the final syllable of the word

Some examples of words containing minor syllables:
   'switch, button'
   'flute'
   'mock'
   'be wanton'
   'rice-water'

Writing system 

The Burmese alphabet consists of 33 letters and 12 vowels and is written from left to right. It requires no spaces between words, although modern writing usually contains spaces after each clause to enhance readability. The consonants are arranged into six consonant groups (called ) based on articulation, like other Brahmi scripts. Tone markings and vowel modifications are written as diacritics placed to the left, right, top, and bottom of letters.

"school" in old Burmese   →   in modern Burmese). Similar mergers are seen in other Sino-Tibetan languages like Shanghainese, and to a lesser extent, Cantonese.

Written Burmese dates to the early Pagan period. Burmese orthography originally followed a square block format, but the cursive format took hold from the 17th century when increased literacy and the resulting explosion of Burmese literature led to the wider use of palm leaves and folded paper known as parabaiks.

Grammar 
The basic word order of the Burmese language is subject-object-verb. Pronouns in Burmese vary according to the gender and status of the audience, although pronouns are often omitted. Affixes are used to convey information. Verbs are almost always suffixed and nouns declined.

Case Affixes

Burmese is an agglutinative with an extensive case system and nouns are suffixed to determine their syntactic function in a sentence or clause. For example, the subject marker tells us the noun is the doer of an action and the object marker tells us that it is getting the recipient of an action. Sometimes the case markers are different in the High Literary register and the Colloquial register.

The case markers in the High Burmese are:

Subject: thi (သည်), ká (က), hma (မှာ)

Object: ko (ကို)

Recipient: à (အား)

Allative: thó (သို့)

Ablative: hmá (မှ), ká (က)

Locative: hnai (၌), hma (မှာ), twin (တွင်)

Comitative: hnín (နှင့်)

Instrumental: hpyin (ဖြင့်), hnin (နှင့်)

Possessive: í (၏)

The cases markers in Colloquial Burmese are:

Subject: ha (ဟာ), ká (က)

Object: ko (ကို)

Recipient: ko (ကို)

Allative: ko (ကို)

Ablative: ká (က)

Locative: hma (မှာ)

Comitative: né (နဲ့)

Instrumental: né (နဲ့)

Possessive: yé (ရဲ့)

Adjectives 
Burmese does not have adjectives per se. Rather, it has verbs that carry the meaning "to be X", where X is an English adjective. These verbs can modify a noun by means of the suffix  tai.  in colloquial Burmese (literary form:  sau), which is suffixed as follows:
Colloquial:  hkyau: tai. lu 
Formal:  hkyau: so: lu
Gloss: "beautiful" + adjective particle + 'person'

Adjectives may also form a compound with the noun (e.g.  lu hkyau:  'person' + 'be beautiful').

Comparatives are usually ordered: X +  htak pui  + adjective, where X is the object being compared to. Superlatives are indicated with the prefix  a.  + adjective +  hcum: .

Verbs 
The roots of Burmese verbs almost always have affixes which convey information like tense, aspect, intention, politeness, mood, etc. Many of these affixes also have formal/literary and colloquial equivalents. In fact, the only time in which no suffix is attached to a verb is in imperative commands.

The most commonly used verb affixes and their usage are shown below with an example verb root  ca:  ('to eat'). Alone, the statement  is imperative.

The affix  tai  (literary form:  sany ) can be viewed as a affix marking the present tense and/or a factual statement:

The affix  hkai.  denotes that the action took place in the past. However, this affix is not always necessary to indicate the past tense such that it can convey the same information without it. But to emphasize that the action happened before another event that is also currently being discussed, the affix becomes imperative. Note that the affix  tai  in this case denotes a factual statement rather than the present tense:

The affix  ne  is used to denote an action in progression. It is equivalent to the English '-ing'.

This affix  pri , which is used when an action that had been expected to be performed by the subject is now finally being performed, has no equivalent in English. So in the above example, if someone had been expecting the subject to eat, and the subject has finally started eating, the affix  is used as follows:

The affix  mai  (literary form:  many ) is used to indicate the future tense or an action which is yet to be performed:

Therefore, it could be termed as the "immediate future tense suffix".

When  is used alone, however, it is imperative:

Verbs are negated by the prefix  ma. .

The verb suffix  nai.  (literary form:  hnang. ) indicates a command:

The verb suffix  bhu:  indicates a statement:

Nouns 
Nouns in Burmese are pluralized by suffixing  twe  (or  if the word ends in a glottal stop) in colloquial Burmese or  mya:  in formal Burmese. The suffix  tou. , which indicates a group of persons or things, is also suffixed to the modified noun. An example is below:
  mrac  "river"
  mrac twe  "rivers" [colloquial]
  mrac mya:  "rivers" [formal]
  mrac tou:  "rivers"

Plural suffixes are not used when the noun is quantified with a number.

Although Burmese does not have grammatical gender (e.g. masculine or feminine nouns), a distinction is made between the sexes, especially in animals and plants, by means of suffix particles. Nouns are masculinized with the following suffixes:  hti: ,  hpa , or  hpui , depending on the noun, and feminized with the suffix  ma. . Examples of usage are below:
  kraung hti:  "male cat"
  kraung ma.  "female cat"
  krak hpa.  "rooster/cock"
  htan: hpui  "male toddy palm plant"

Numerical classifiers 

Like its neighboring languages such as Thai, Bengali, and Chinese, Burmese uses numerical classifiers (also called measure words) when nouns are counted or quantified. This approximately equates to English expressions such as "two slices of bread" or "a cup of coffee". Classifiers are required when counting nouns, so  hka.le: nga:  (lit. 'child five') is incorrect, since the measure word for people  yauk  is missing; it needs to suffix the numeral.

The standard word order of quantified words is: quantified noun + numeral adjective + classifier, except in round numbers (numbers that end in zero), in which the word order is flipped, where the quantified noun precedes the classifier: quantified noun + classifier + numeral adjective. The only exception to this rule is the number 10, which follows the standard word order.

Measurements of time, such as "hour,"  "day,"  or "month,"  do not require classifiers.

Below are some of the most commonly used classifiers in Burmese.

Affixes 
The Burmese language makes prominent usage of affixes (called  in Burmese), which are untranslatable words that are suffixed or prefixed to words to indicate tense, aspect, case, formality etc. For example,   is a suffix used to indicate the imperative mood. While  ('work' + suffix indicating politeness) does not indicate the imperative,  ('work' + suffix indicating imperative mood + suffix indicating politeness) does. Affixes are often stacked next to each other

Some affixes modify the word's part of speech. Among the most prominent of these is the prefix  , which is prefixed to verbs and adjectives to form nouns or adverbs. Moreover, in colloquial Burmese, there is a tendency to omit the second  in words that follow the pattern  + noun/adverb +  + noun/adverb, like , which is pronounced  and formally pronounced .

Pronouns 

Subject pronouns begin sentences, though the subject is generally omitted in the imperative forms and in conversation. Grammatically speaking, subject markers (  in colloquial,   in formal) must be attached to the subject pronoun, although they are also generally omitted in conversation. Object pronouns must have an object marker (  in colloquial,   in formal) attached immediately after the pronoun. Proper nouns are often substituted for pronouns. One's status in relation to the audience determines the pronouns used, with certain pronouns used for different audiences.

Polite pronouns are used to address elders, teachers, and strangers, through the use of feudal-era third person pronouns in lieu of first- and second-person pronouns. In such situations, one refers to oneself in third person:  kya. nau  for men and  kya. ma.  for women, both meaning "your servant", and refer to the addressee as  min  ('your highness'),  khang bya:  ('master, lord') or  hrang  "ruler/master". So ingrained are these terms in the daily polite speech that people use them as the first and second person pronouns without giving a second thought to the root meaning of these pronouns.

When speaking to a person of the same status or of younger age,  nga  ('I/me') and  nang  ('you') may be used, although most speakers choose to use third person pronouns. For example, an older person may use  dau le:  ('aunt') or  u: lei:  ('uncle') to refer to himself, while a younger person may use either  sa:  ('son') or  sa.mi:  ('daughter').

The basic pronouns are:

* The basic particle to indicate plurality is  tui., colloquial  dui..
‡ Used by male speakers.
† Used by female speakers.

Other pronouns are reserved for speaking with bhikkhus (Buddhist monks). When speaking to a bhikkhu, pronouns like  bhun: bhun: (from  phun: kri: 'monk'),  chara dau  ('royal teacher'), and  a.hrang bhu.ra:  ('your lordship') are used depending on their status . When referring to oneself, terms like  ta. paey. tau ('royal disciple') or  da. ka , ('donor') are used. When speaking to a monk, the following pronouns are used:

† The particle ma.  is suffixed for women.
‡ Typically reserved for the chief monk of a kyaung (monastery).

In colloquial Burmese, possessive pronouns are contracted when the root pronoun itself is low toned. Examples include the following:
   "I" +  (postpositional marker for possessive case) =   "my"
   "you" +  (postpositional marker for possessive case) =   "your"
   "he, she" +  (postpositional marker for possessive case) =   "his, her"

Kinship terms 

Minor pronunciation differences do exist within regions of Irrawaddy valley. However, the most obvious difference between Upper Burmese and Lower Burmese is that Upper Burmese speech still differentiates maternal and paternal sides of a family:

1 The youngest (paternal or maternal) aunt may be called  , and the youngest paternal uncle  .

In a testament to the power of media, the Yangon-based speech is gaining currency even in Upper Burma. Upper Burmese-specific usage, while historically and technically accurate, is increasingly viewed as distinctly rural or regional speech. In fact, some usages are already considered strictly regional Upper Burmese speech and are likely to die out. For example:

In general, the male-centric names of old Burmese for familial terms have been replaced in standard Burmese with formerly female-centric terms, which are now used by both sexes.

Reduplication 
Reduplication is prevalent in Burmese and is used to intensify or weaken adjectives' meanings. For example, if   "beautiful" is reduplicated, then the intensity of the adjective's meaning increases. Many Burmese words, especially adjectives with two syllables, such as   "beautiful", when reduplicated ( →  ) become adverbs. This is also true of some Burmese verbs and nouns (e.g.  'a moment' →  'frequently'), which become adverbs when reduplicated.

Some nouns are also reduplicated to indicate plurality.

A few measure words can also be reduplicated to indicate "one or the other":
  (measure word for people) →  ('someone')
  (measure word for things) →  ('something')

Numerals

Burmese digits are traditionally written using a set of numerals unique to the Mon–Burmese script, although Arabic numerals are also used in informal contexts. The cardinal forms of Burmese numerals are primarily inherited from the Proto-Sino-Tibetan language, with cognates with modern-day Sino-Tibetan languages, including the Chinese and Tibetan. Numerals beyond 'ten million' are borrowed from Indic languages like Sanskrit or Pali. Similarly, the ordinal forms of primary Burmese numerals (i.e., from first to tenth) are borrowed from Pali, the liturgical language of Theravada Buddhism. Ordinal numbers beyond ten are suffixed .

Burmese numerals follow the nouns they modify, with the exception of round numbers, which precede the nouns they modify. Moreover, numerals are subject to several tone sandhi and voicing rules that involve tone changes (low tone → creaky tone) and voicing shifts depending on the pronunciation of surrounding words. A more thorough explanation is found on Burmese numerals.

Romanization and transcription 

There is no official romanization system for Burmese. There have been attempts to make one, but none have been successful. Replicating Burmese sounds in the Latin script is complicated. There is a Pali-based transcription system in existence, MLC Transcription System which was devised by the Myanmar Language Commission (MLC). However, it only transcribes sounds in formal Burmese and is based on the Burmese alphabet rather than the phonology.

Several colloquial transcription systems have been proposed, but none is overwhelmingly preferred over others.

Transcription of Burmese is not standardized, as seen in the varying English transcriptions of Burmese names. For instance, a Burmese personal name like   may be variously romanized as Win, Winn, Wyn, or Wynn, while   may be romanized as Khaing, Khine, or Khain.

Computer fonts and standard keyboard layout 

The Burmese alphabet can be entered from a standard QWERTY keyboard and is supported within the Unicode standard, meaning it can be read and written from most modern computers and smartphones.

Burmese has complex character rendering requirements, where tone markings and vowel modifications are noted using diacritics. These can be placed before consonants (as with ), above them (as with ) or even around them (as with ). These character clusters are built using multiple keystrokes. In particular, the inconsistent placement of diacritics as a feature of the language presents a conflict between an intuitive WYSIWYG typing approach, and a logical consonant-first storage approach.

Since its introduction in 2007, the most popular Burmese font, Zawgyi, has been near-ubiquitous in Myanmar. Linguist Justin Watkins argues that the ubiquitous use of Zawgyi harms Myanmar languages, including Burmese, by preventing efficient sorting, searching, processing and analyzing Myanmar text through flexible diacritic ordering.

Zawgyi is not Unicode-compliant, but occupies the same code space as Unicode Myanmar font. As it is not defined as a standard character encoding, Zawgyi is not built in to any major operating systems as standard. However, allow for its position as the de facto (but largely undocumented) standard within the country, telcos and major smartphone distributors (such as Huawei and Samsung) ship phones with Zawgyi font overwriting standard Unicode-compliant fonts, which are installed on most internationally distributed hardware. Facebook also supports Zawgyi as an additional language encoding for their app and website. As a result, almost all SMS alerts (including those from telcos to their customers), social media posts and other web resources may be incomprehensible on these devices without the custom Zawgyi font installed at the operating system level. These may include devices purchased overseas, or distributed by companies who do not customize software for the local market.

Keyboards which have a Zawgyi keyboard layout printed on them are the most commonly available for purchase domestically.

Until recently, Unicode compliant fonts have been more difficult to type than Zawgyi, as they have a stricter, less forgiving and arguably less intuitive method for ordering diacritics. However, intelligent input software such as Keymagic and recent versions of smartphone soft-keyboards including Gboard and ttKeyboard allow for more forgiving input sequences and Zawgyi keyboard layouts which produce Unicode-compliant text.

A number of Unicode-compliant Burmese fonts exist. The national standard keyboard layout is known as the Myanmar3 layout, and it was published along with the Myanmar3 Unicode font. The layout, developed by the Myanmar Unicode and NLP Research Center, has a smart input system to cover the complex structures of Burmese and related scripts.

In addition to the development of computer fonts and standard keyboard layout, there is still a lot of scope of research for the Burmese language, specifically for Natural Language Processing (NLP) areas like WordNet, Search Engine, development of parallel corpus for Burmese language as well as development of a formally standardized and dense domain-specific corpus of Burmese language.

Myanmar government has designated 1 October 2019 as "U-Day" to officially switch to Unicode. The full transition is estimated to take two years.

See also

Notes

References

Bibliography

External links 

 Omniglot: Burmese Language
 Learn Burmese online
 Online Burmese lessons
 Burmese language resources from SOAS
 
 Myanmar Unicode and NLP Research Center 
 Myanmar 3 font and keyboard
 Burmese online dictionary (Unicode)
 Ayar Myanmar online dictionary
 Myanmar unicode character table
 Download KaNaungConverter_Window_Build200508.zip from the Kanaung project page and Unzip Ka Naung Converter Engine

 
Analytic languages
Isolating languages
Languages of Bangladesh
Languages of Myanmar
Subject–object–verb languages
Tonal languages